Ross Parker may refer to:

Murder of Ross Parker, a racially motivated crime shortly after the September 11th terror attacks
Ross Parker (songwriter) (1914–1974), born Albert Rostron Parker, co-wrote the song "We'll Meet Again"
Ross Parker (athlete) (born 1935), Australian Olympic hurdler
Ross Parker (footballer) (born 1949), Australian footballer

See also
 Geoffrey Ross Parker, or Geoff Parker (cricketer)
 Ross (name)
 Parker (disambiguation)